Lu Kanru (November 16, 1903 – December 1, 1978) was a scholar of classical Chinese literature and a lifelong collaborator of his wife Feng Yuanjun. Like his wife, he worked at Shandong University for most of his career.

References

1903 births
1978 deaths
Republic of China historians
People's Republic of China historians
People's Republic of China politicians from Jiangsu
20th-century Chinese historians
Politicians from Nantong
Victims of the Cultural Revolution
Academic staff of Shandong University
Academic staff of Fudan University
Academic staff of Jinan University
Academic staff of Yenching University
Academic staff of Sun Yat-sen University
Academic staff of the Northeastern University (China)
Educators from Nantong
Writers from Nantong
National University of Peking alumni
Tsinghua University alumni
University of Paris alumni
Historians from Jiangsu
Chinese literary theorists